"Muchacha Triste" ("Sad Girl") is a song written and produced by Luis Alva for the Venezuelan group Los Fantasmas del Caribe for their debut album Caramelo (1993). The song reached number one on the Billboard Hot Latin Songs in the United States in 1993 and ended as the fifth best-performing song of the year in the country. The song was nominated Pop Song of the Year at the 1994 Lo Nuestro Awards.

DJ Kane version

"Muchacha Triste" was covered by DJ Kane. It is the second single from the album Capítulo III: Ahogando Penas (2007).

Los Super Reyes version

"Muchacha Triste" was covered by Cruz Martínez y Los Super Reyes. It is the third single from the album El Regreso de los Reyes (2007).

References

1993 songs
2007 singles
2008 singles
Los Super Reyes songs
Song recordings produced by Cruz Martínez
1993 debut singles